Marilyn Marshall  is a former association football player and softball player who represented New Zealand at international level.

Marshall made her Football Ferns debut in their first ever international as they beat Hong Kong 2–0 on 25 August 1975 at the inaugural AFC Women's Asian Cup, her sister Debbie Leonidas making her New Zealand debut in the same match. She has the distinction of scoring New Zealand's first ever women's international goal and finished her international career with 18 caps and 9 goals to her credit.

Honours

New Zealand
AFC Women's Championship: 1975

References

Year of birth missing (living people)
Living people
New Zealand women's international footballers
New Zealand women's association footballers
Women's association footballers not categorized by position